Trouble Boys is a 2013 studio album by the Swedish dansband Lasse Stefanz. It was released on 19 June 2013, and topped the Sverigetopplistan, the official Swedish Albums Chart on 28 June 2013.

The album stayed for seven weeks at number 1 position making it one of the most successful Swedish albums of 2013 alongside Mando Diao's Infruset and Gyllene Tider's Dags att tänka på refrängen.

It was also released in Norway where it reached number 2 on the Norwegian VG-lista official albums chart.

Track listing
När hon glömt
Trouble Boys
Väl bevarat och gömt
Riktig kärlek
Lies
När jag är med dig
Ingen ser min tår
Lång väg tillbaka
Res dig Joe
Dags för en tango
Kan du älska mig ändå
Twang thang
Samma tid, samma plats
Bruden som går över lik
När livet vänder

Charts

Weekly charts

Year-end charts

References

2013 albums
Swedish-language albums
Lasse Stefanz albums